Yuki Saito may refer to:

, Japanese singer-songwriter, actress, essayist and poet
, Japanese baseball pitcher for the Hiroshima Toyo Carp
, Japanese baseball pitcher for the Hokkaido Nippon-Ham Fighters